The Dog Star is a nickname for Sirius, a star in the constellation Canis Major (Greater Dog).

Dog Star or Dogstar may also refer to:

Art, entertainment, and media
 Dogstar (band), a rock group including Keanu Reeves
 "Dog Star" (short story), a short story by Arthur C. Clarke
 Dogstar (TV series), a 2006 animated Australian TV series
 Dog Star, a fictional bar in The Returned (U.S. TV series)
 "Dogstar", a song by Hybrid from the 2006 album I Choose Noise
 "Dog Star", a song by Klaatu from the 1980 album Endangered Species
 The Dog Star, a 1950 novel by Donald Windham
 The Dog Stars, a 2012 novel by Peter Heller